Diplomatic Police is a subdivision of Law Enforcement Command of Islamic Republic of Iran, responsible for protection of diplomatic missions in Iran and their VIPs under diplomatic law.

See also 
 2009 attack on Pakistan Embassy in Tehran
 2011 attack on the British Embassy in Iran
 2016 attack on the Saudi diplomatic missions in Iran

References 

Specialist law enforcement agencies of Iran
Law Enforcement Command of Islamic Republic of Iran